Cnemodus is a genus of dirt-colored seed bugs in the family Rhyparochromidae. There are at least two described species in Cnemodus.

Species
These two species belong to the genus Cnemodus:
 Cnemodus hirtipes Blatchley, 1924
 Cnemodus mavortius (Say, 1831)

References

Rhyparochromidae
Articles created by Qbugbot